The Lovington Fire Department Building, also known as the Lovington Fire Station, is a fire station in Lovington, New Mexico which was built in 1941.  It was listed on the National Register of Historic Places in 2008.

It is a one-story building with two fire engine bays.   It was built as a Works Progress Administration project during 1941-42 and served as Lovington's city hall, as well as its fire station.

It is optimistically described as having International Style architecture.

A new fire and police department building was constructed in 1984, just to the south;  the historic building continued to serve by providing space for training and as a repair shop.

References

National Register of Historic Places in New Mexico
International style architecture in New Mexico
Infrastructure completed in 1941
Lea County, New Mexico
Fire stations on the National Register of Historic Places in New Mexico
New Mexico State Register of Cultural Properties